The 1994 Oklahoma Sooners baseball team represented the University of Oklahoma in the 1994 NCAA Division I baseball season. The Sooners played their home games at L. Dale Mitchell Baseball Park. The team was coached by Larry Cochell in his 4th season at Oklahoma.

The Sooners won the College World Series, defeating the Georgia Tech Yellow Jackets in the championship game.

Roster

Bat Boy: Sunny Golloway

Schedule

! style="" | Regular Season
|-

|- align="center" bgcolor="ddffdd"
| February 5 ||  || L. Dale Mitchell Baseball Park || 14-0 || 1-0 || –
|- align="center" bgcolor="ddffdd"
| February 6 || Missouri Southern || L. Dale Mitchell Baseball Park || 9-1 || 2-0 || –
|- align="center" bgcolor="ddffdd"
| February 20 ||  || L. Dale Mitchell Baseball Park || 9-4 || 3-0 || –
|- align="center" bgcolor="ddffdd"
| February 20 || Oklahoma City || L. Dale Mitchell Baseball Park || 14-1 || 4-0 || –
|- align="center" bgcolor="ddffdd"
| February 22 || at  || TCU Diamond || 12-11 || 5-0 || –
|- align="center" bgcolor="ddffdd"
| February 25 || vs. Georgia Tech || Goodwin Field || 8-6 || 6-0 || –
|- align="center" bgcolor="ffdddd"
| February 26 || at  || Goodwin Field || 1-4 || 6-1 || –
|- align="center" bgcolor="ddffdd"
| February 27 || vs.  || Goodwin Field || 10-9 || 7-1 || –
|-

|- align="center" bgcolor="ddffdd"
| March 4 || at  || Disch-Falk Field || 5-4 || 8-1 || –
|- align="center" bgcolor="ffdddd"
| March 5 || at Texas || Disch-Falk Field || 4-6 || 8-2 || –
|- align="center" bgcolor="ddffdd"
| March 7 || vs.  || Cougar Field || 13-7 || 9-2 || –
|- align="center" bgcolor="ddffdd"
| March 7 || at  || Cougar Field || 7-3 || 10-2 || –
|- align="center" bgcolor="ddffdd"
| March 8 || vs.  || Cougar Field || 8-0 || 11-2 || –
|- align="center" bgcolor="ffdddd"
| March 9 || at Houston || Cougar Field || 3-8 || 11-3 || –
|- align="center" bgcolor="ddffdd"
| March 11 ||  || L. Dale Mitchell Ballpark || 6-1 || 12-3 || 1-0
|- align="center" bgcolor="ddffdd"
| March 12 || Iowa State || L. Dale Mitchell Ballpark || 9-3 || 13-3 || 2-0
|- align="center" bgcolor="ddffdd"
| March 13 ||  || L. Dale Mitchell Ballpark || 6-5 || 14-3 || –
|- align="center" bgcolor="ffdddd"
| March 14 || Mississippi || L. Dale Mitchell Ballpark || 9-13 || 14-4 || –
|- align="center" bgcolor="ddffdd"
| March 16 ||  || L. Dale Mitchell Ballpark || 12-3 || 15-4 || –
|- align="center" bgcolor="ffdddd"
| March 19 ||  || L. Dale Mitchell Ballpark || 4-14 || 15-5 || 2-1
|- align="center" bgcolor="ffdddd"
| March 20 || Kansas || L. Dale Mitchell Ballpark || 7-9 || 15-6 || 2-2
|- align="center" bgcolor="ddffdd"
| March 22 ||  || L. Dale Mitchell Ballpark || 12-11 || 16-6 || –
|- align="center" bgcolor="ddffdd"
| March 23 || South Alabama || L. Dale Mitchell Ballpark || 14-7 || 17-6 || –
|- align="center" bgcolor="ffdddd"
| March 25 || at Kansas || Hoglund Ballpark || 4-6 || 17-7 || 2-3
|- align="center" bgcolor="ffdddd"
| March 26 || at Kansas || Hoglund Ballpark || 1-2 || 17-8 || 2-4
|- align="center" bgcolor="ddffdd"
| March 27 || at Kansas || Hoglund Ballpark || 9-7 || 18-8 || 3-4
|- align="center" bgcolor="ddffdd"
| March 29 ||  || L. Dale Mitchell Ballpark || 6-1 || 19-8 || 4-4
|- align="center" bgcolor="ddffdd"
| March 30 || Kansas State || L. Dale Mitchell Ballpark || 6-0 || 20-8 || 5-4
|-

|- align="center" bgcolor="ffdddd"
| April 1 ||  || L. Dale Mitchell Ballpark || 3-6 || 20-9 || –
|- align="center" bgcolor="ddffdd"
| April 2 || Texas Tech || L. Dale Mitchell Ballpark || 10-8 || 21-9 || –
|- align="center" bgcolor="ddffdd"
| April 4 || TCU || L. Dale Mitchell Ballpark || 8-7 || 22-9 || –
|- align="center" bgcolor="ddffdd"
| April 6 ||  || L. Dale Mitchell Ballpark || 11-2 || 23-9 || –
|- align="center" bgcolor="ddffdd"
| April 9 || at Iowa State || Cap Timm Field || 8-6 || 24-9 || 6-4
|- align="center" bgcolor="ddffdd"
| April 9 || at Iowa State || Cap Timm Field || 8-6 || 25-9 || 7-4
|- align="center" bgcolor="ddffdd"
| April 10 || at Iowa State || Cap Timm Field || 12-3 || 26-9 || 8-4
|- align="center" bgcolor="ddffdd"
| April 13 || at  || Simmons Field || 7-4 || 27-9 || 9-4
|- align="center" bgcolor="ddffdd"
| April 13 || at Missouri || Simmons Field || 5-4 || 28-9 || 10-4
|- align="center" bgcolor="ffdddd"
| April 15 || vs.  || Drillers Stadium || 3-4 || 28-10 || 10-5
|- align="center" bgcolor="ffdddd"
| April 16 || vs. Oklahoma State || All Sports Stadium || 4-11 || 28-11 || 10-6
|- align="center" bgcolor="ddffdd"
| April 17 || vs. Oklahoma State || All Sports Stadium || 8-2 || 29-11 || 11-6
|- align="center" bgcolor="ddffdd"
| April 19 || Oklahoma State || L. Dale Mitchell Ballpark || 4-2 || 30-11 || 12-6
|- align="center" bgcolor="ffdddd"
| April 20 || at Oklahoma State || Allie P. Reynolds Stadium || 5-10 || 30-12 || 12-7
|- align="center" bgcolor="ddffdd"
| April 22 || at Kansas State || Tointon Family Stadium || 7-3 || 31-12 || 13-7
|- align="center" bgcolor="ffdddd"
| April 23 || at Kansas State || Tointon Family Stadium || 14-16 || 31-13 || 13-8
|- align="center" bgcolor="ddffdd"
| April 24 || at Kansas || Hoglund Ballpark || 21-7 || 32-13 || 14-8
|- align="center" bgcolor="ffdddd"
| April 26 || at  || L. Dale Mitchell Ballpark || 1-4 || 32-14 || –
|-

|- align="center" bgcolor="ddffdd"
| May 7 ||  || L. Dale Mitchell Ballpark || 3-1 || 33-14 || 15-8
|- align="center" bgcolor="ddffdd"
| May 7 || Nebraska || L. Dale Mitchell Ballpark || 7-5 || 34-14 || 16-8
|- align="center" bgcolor="ddffdd"
| May 8 || Nebraska || L. Dale Mitchell Ballpark || 13-9 || 35-14 || 17-8
|- align="center" bgcolor="ffdddd"
| May 10 || at Nebraska || Buck Belzer Stadium || 6-7 || 35-15 || 17-9
|- align="center" bgcolor="ddffdd"
| May 11 || at Nebraska || Buck Belzer Stadium || 4-0 || 36-15 || 18-9
|- align="center" bgcolor="ddffdd"
| May 14 || Missouri || L. Dale Mitchell Ballpark || 7-6 || 37-15 || 19-9
|- align="center" bgcolor="ddffdd"
| May 15 || Missouri || L. Dale Mitchell Ballpark || 4-1 || 38-15 || 20-9
|- align="center" bgcolor="ddffdd"
| May 16 || Missouri || L. Dale Mitchell Ballpark || 7-6 || 39-15 || 21-9
|-

|-
! style="" | Postseason
|-

|- align="center" bgcolor="ffdddd"
| June 19 || vs. Nebraska || All Sports Stadium || 2-3 || 39-16
|- align="center" bgcolor="ddffdd"
| June 20 || vs. Missouri || All Sports Stadium || 15-2 || 40-16
|- align="center" bgcolor="ddffdd"
| June 21 || vs. Iowa State || All Sports Stadium || 5-3 || 41-16
|- align="center" bgcolor="ddffdd"
| June 22 || vs. Nebraska || All Sports Stadium || 21-4 || 42-16
|- align="center" bgcolor="ffdddd"
| June 22 || vs. Oklahoma State || All Sports Stadium || 3-6 || 42-17
|-

|- align="center" bgcolor="ddffdd"
| June 27 || vs.  || Disch-Falk Field || 10-3 || 43-17
|- align="center" bgcolor="ddffdd"
| June 28 || vs.  || Disch-Falk Field || 10-4 || 44-17
|- align="center" bgcolor="ddffdd"
| June 29 || vs. Texas || Disch-Falk Field || 15-4 || 45-17
|- align="center" bgcolor="ddffdd"
| June 30 || vs. Texas || Disch-Falk Field || 6-3 || 46-17
|-

|- align="center" bgcolor="ddffdd"
| June 4 || vs.  || Rosenblatt Stadium || 5-4 || 47-17
|- align="center" bgcolor="ddffdd"
| June 5 || vs. Arizona State || Rosenblatt Stadium || 4-3 || 48-17
|- align="center" bgcolor="ddffdd"
| June 9 || vs. Arizona State || Rosenblatt Stadium || 6-1 || 49-17
|- align="center" bgcolor="ddffdd"
| June 11 || vs. Georgia Tech || Rosenblatt Stadium || 13-5 || 50-17
|-

Awards and honors 
Bucky Buckles
All-Big Eight First Team 
Big Eight All-Tournament Team

Chip Glass
Big Eight All-Tournament Team 
College World Series Most Outstanding Player

Rick Gutierrez
All-America First Team
Big Eight Player of the Year 
All-Big Eight First Team 
Big Eight All-Tournament Team 
College World Series All-Tournament Team

Rich Hills
All-America Second Team 
All-Big Eight First Team 
Big Eight All-Tournament Team

Kevin Lovingier
All-Big Eight First Team

M.J. Mariani
Big Eight All-Tournament Team

Ryan Minor
Big Eight All-Tournament Team
College World Series All-Tournament Team

Mark Redman
Big Eight Newcomer of the Year 
All-Big Eight First Team 
College World Series All-Tournament Team

Darvin Traylor
All-Big Eight First Team 
College World Series All-Tournament Team

Sooners in the 1994 MLB Draft
The following members of the Oklahoma Sooners baseball program were drafted in the 1994 Major League Baseball Draft.

References

Oklahoma
Oklahoma Sooners baseball seasons
College World Series seasons
NCAA Division I Baseball Championship seasons
Oklahoma